Chia-Hsiung Tze (often H.C. Tze) is a professor emeritus at Virginia Tech. He is a theoretical particle physicist focusing on group theory, string theory, supersymmetry, octonions and other topics in theoretical physics.

He was a colleague of the Feza Gürsey.

Publications

Articles

Books

References

Living people
Particle physicists
Year of birth missing (living people)
Virginia Tech faculty